Nay Aug Park is the largest park in Scranton, Pennsylvania, United States.  An amusement park on the site closed in the 1990s, but a small amusement area still operates near the swimming pool complex. The park also houses the Nay Aug Gorge, the Everhart Museum, and two Olympic-sized swimming pools. At one time it also had a zoo.

The name of the park is of Native American origin and means "noisy brook."

Park

The gorge

The Nay Aug Gorge was created at the end of the most recent ice age and is a popular (though dangerous and illegal, where violators are slapped with heavy fines) swimming spot. In 2007 the David Wenzel Tree House opened with views overlooking the gorge and surrounding area.  The tree house is designed to be fully handicapped accessible, and is the first of its kind in the area. A footbridge with views of Roaring Brook also opened in 2007. In June, 2017 access to the tree house was closed indefinitely due to structural concerns. The footbridge has been reopened in May 2019.

The zoo
The Zoo at Nay Aug once hosted the famous Tilly the elephant and Joshua the donkey. The zoo closed in 1988, and in 1989, the newest elephant, Toni, was shipped to the National Zoo in Washington D.C. The zoo remained closed until the summer of 2003, when it reopened as the Genesis Wildlife Center. A 2008 Time magazine article rated it the 4th most abusive zoo in America.  In 2009 the zoo once again closed, due to public outcry over conditions, and Lackawanna College announced plans to turn it into a natural research center. 
These plans fell through, and the Scranton Recreation Authority started plans in 2012 to redevelop it as part of the park, removing cages but preserving the 70-year-old main zoo building. It was announced on August 27, 2014, that the zoo will be leased for $1 per year for the next five years by a local non-profit called "Street Cats" to spay and neuter the feral cat population in the city of Scranton.

Scenes from the 1982 film That Championship Season were filmed in the park's zoo.

Swimming pools
Two Olympic-size swimming pools can be found at the park. Recently renovated, the pool now offers a two diving boards and two water slides. However, after being closed since 2020 due to the COVID-19 pandemic it was announced that they would rip up the pool. The pool and slides were demolished in 2022.

The Everhart Museum

The Everhart Museum was founded in 1908 by Dr. Isaiah Fawkes Everhart. In honor of the museum's founder, a bronze statue of Dr. Everhart and Lake Everhart were dedicated on May 20, 1911. Dr. Everhart died five days later. The Everhart is the largest public museum in Northeastern Pennsylvania.  It is a non-profit institution dedicated to the collection, care and display of a diverse array of artifacts, including natural history, science and fine arts. The museum also contains a library with books pertaining to areas of interest covered by the collection.

Amusement park
Nay Aug Amusement Park was a small amusement park within the park grounds. It was run by Karl and Ralph Strohl, who received the park from their father. The amusements included toy tanks in a circle, caterpillar, bumper cars, helicopters, cars on a track, merry-go-round, boats in a small pond, and a small whip.  One of the park's highlights was the small wooden roller coaster, the Comet Coaster (also known as Comet, Jr.). There was a miniature Lackawanna train which went around the roller coaster.  The arcade pavilion building was previously a dance hall during the 1930s and 1940s where big bands came to play. From the 1950s until the park's closing, the building housed the bumper cars amusement ride, which was ringed by various arcade machines and amusements like pinball, skee-ball, skill crane and other machines. The pavilion was open on two or three sides in the summer months. Directly in front of the pavilion was the Carousel. The park was closed in the 1990s, and its site is now green space.

Christmas light show 
Since the early 2000s the park has been home to the show, which features more than 100 Christmas-seasonal light displays. It begins at the entrance on Mulberry Street and stretches past the tree house, former petting zoo, the playground and pool areas before exiting on Olive Street. Depending on the weather there is a horse and carriage for rides. Admission is free but donations are accepted to help the park throughout the year.

References

External links

 Nay Aug Park home page
 History of the Everhart Museum
 Genesis Wildlife Homepage

Amusement parks in Pennsylvania
National Natural Landmarks in Pennsylvania
Tourist attractions in Scranton, Pennsylvania
Defunct amusement parks in Pennsylvania
Parks in Lackawanna County, Pennsylvania
1989 establishments in Pennsylvania
Amusement parks opened in 1989